Dennis Wardlow (born c. 1944) is a former mayor of Key West, Florida, having served on three occasions.

He is best known for being the prime minister of the Conch Republic, the micronation that seceded from the United States on April 23, 1982, in protest over a United States Border Patrol blockade which severely damaged the tourism economy of the Florida Keys.
In 2006 he heard that the US would shut down fort Jefferson he sent a naval force to take back fort Jefferson but the park rangers wrote trespassing citations

External links
Wardlow fined by Governor Bush for ethics violations

1950s births
20th-century American politicians
Living people
Micronational leaders
Mayors of Key West, Florida